Guy Jackson (20 September 1921 – 18 June 1972) was a tennis player and businessman from Ireland.

Career
Jackson competed at the Wimbledon Championships on eight occasions, in 1947, 1948, 1949, 1951, 1952, 1953, 1954 and 1960. He made the second round three times.

In the Davis Cup, Jackson took part in 15 ties, the first in 1948 and last in 1964. He won nine singles rubbers and four doubles matches for Ireland.

Staines air disaster
Jackson, an executive with Guinness Brewery, was one of 12 Irish senior businessmen on board British European Airways Flight 548, which crashed near the town of Staines. There were no survivors.

References

1921 births
1972 deaths
Victims of aviation accidents or incidents in England
20th-century Irish businesspeople
Irish male tennis players